USS Roamer is a name used more than once by the United States Navy and may refer to:

 , a patrol boat in commission from 1917 to 1919
 , a cargo ship in commission from 1942 to 1946

United States Navy ship names